Philipa Seth (born 19 February 1994) is an Australian rules footballer playing for the Fremantle Football Club in the AFL Women's (AFLW). Seth was drafted by Fremantle with their third selection and twenty-eighth overall in the 2018 AFL Women's draft. She made her debut in the four point win against  at Casey Fields in the opening round of the 2019 season.

Seth is a former touch rugby player at the Southern Stars from Perth who spent time in Collie, Western Australia in the South West and works as a physiotherapist. 

Seth was awarded Fremantle's best first year player award in 2019, after playing in all 8 games for the season.

References

External links 

1994 births
Living people
Fremantle Football Club (AFLW) players
Australian rules footballers from Western Australia